Fursatganj Airfield is an airfield at Fursatganj of Amethi district (formerly in Raebareli district) in the Indian state of Uttar Pradesh.

Indira Gandhi Rashtriya Uran Akademi is a flight training school established in 1986 and co-located with the airfield under the government of India.

Airlines and destinations 
The airport/airstrip has only unscheduled chartered flights.

Consideration of a new world class civil aviation university
Rahul Gandhi rather than any other of the civil aviation officials announced the much-awaited venue of the civil aviation university, which till date was a mystery. Addressing a public function at Fursatganj in Raebareli district, Uttar Pradesh, Gandhi surprised everyone by his announcement, proposing that Rajiv Gandhi National Aviation University would be built at Fursatganj with an aim to give better training facilities to the pilots. He also announced the expansion of Fursatganj airport, so that farmers' produce can be exported. The announcement was made at a function to mark the 25th anniversary of Indira Gandhi National Aviation Academy (IGRUA), a premier academy of pilot training in India, where Vayalar Ravi was also present. On 17 October, during the International Civil Aviation Conference in Mumbai, Ravi had announced the plans for the  university. Since then, he is believed to be pitching hard for the institution to come to his home turf. MiD DAY had reported ('Kerala to host world class aviation school', 19 October) that during discussions for the project, debates supported that the university should be located between northern and western India, but the aviation minister was of a view that the university must be established in Kerala.

Official confirmation
Talking to MiD DAY, Nasim Zaidi, union civil aviation secretary, said, Yes, it has been decided that the university would be built at Fursatganj in UP and its campus will be close to Indira Gandhi Rashtriya Udaan Academy(IGRUA) at Fursatganj airfield. Despite repeated attempts, Ravi remained unavailable for comment. In order to minimise the scarcity of aviation professionals in the country, the Civil Aviation Ministry mooted the idea of the first aviation university.

Proposed extension of the airport
The aviation ministry has decided that Airports Authority of India will extend the 6,000-ft-long runway at the Indira Gandhi Rashtriya Uran Akademi (IGRUA) at Raebareli to make it fit for bigger jets. And AAI will also construct a passenger terminal to have an airport to replace what is only a flying academy now.

Extension of runway
The decision was taken at IGRUA in a meeting that Rahul had with then aviation minister Vayalar Ravi (Ajit Singh, also from UP, was sworn in as aviation minister on Sunday), aviation secretary Nasim Zaidi and other top officials. The runway is currently 6,000 ft which will be extended to 7,500 ft and then 9,000 ft in the second stage, said sources.

Estimated cost
The estimated cost for the 7,500-ft runway and terminal is Rs 150 crore and it will cost another Rs 100 crore for expanding it, said sources. While a proposal for funding this would be sent to the Planning Commission, aviation authorities estimate that about 350 acres would be needed. The move is expected to lead to economic development - and rich political harvest - as Raebareli could become the fifth city in UP to have an airport after Lucknow, Varanasi, Agra and Kanpur.

See also
 Chaudhary Charan Singh Airport
 Lal Bahadur Shastri Airport
 Noida International Airport
 Kanpur Airport
 Allahabad Airport
 Ayodhya Airport
 Sultanpur Airport

References

Airports in Uttar Pradesh
Proposed airports in Uttar Pradesh
 Amethi district
University and college airports
Airports with year of establishment missing
University and college buildings in India